David Watkins (born 18 August 1928) is a former English cricketer.  Watkins was a right-handed batsman who bowled right-arm medium pace.  He was born at St Albans, Hertfordshire.

Watkins made his first-class appearances for Essex against Northamptonshire.  He appeared infrequently for Essex, making eleven further first-class appearances, the last of which came against Kent in the 1954 County Championship,  In his twelve first-class matches, he scored 210 runs at an average of 16.15, with a high score of 32.  With the ball, he took 8 wickets at a bowling average of 52.62, with best figures of 2/45.  He left Essex at the end of the 1955 season.

References

External links
David Watkins at ESPNcricinfo
David Watkins at CricketArchive

1928 births
Living people
Cricketers from St Albans
English cricketers
Essex cricketers